Vatche Zadourian (born 17 July 1974) is a Lebanese former cyclist. He competed in the individual road race at the 1992 Summer Olympics.

References

External links
 

1974 births
Living people
Lebanese male cyclists
Olympic cyclists of Lebanon
Cyclists at the 1992 Summer Olympics
Place of birth missing (living people)